Andrei Ivanovich Zhelyabov (– ) was a Russian Empire revolutionary and member of the Executive Committee of Narodnaya Volya.

After graduating from a gymnasium in Kerch in 1869, Zhelyabov got into a Law School of the Novorossiysky University in Odessa. He was expelled from the university for his participation in student unrests in October 1871 and sent away from Odessa. In 1873, Zhelyabov lived in a town of Gorodische (present-day Cherkas'ka oblast' of Ukraine) and maintained close ties with revolutionaries from Kiev and activists of the Ukrainian "Gromada". After his return to Odessa, Zhelyabov became a member of the revolutionary Felix Volkhovsky group (the Odessa affiliate of “Chaikovtsi”) and conducted propaganda among workers and intelligentsia. He was arrested in late 1874 and then released on bail. Nevertheless, he continued his illegal activities. Zhelyabov was one of the suspects in the "Trial of the 193". After his acquittal in 1878, he moved to Podolsk province for the purpose of spreading revolutionary propaganda among the peasantry.

Zhelyabov gradually came to support violent political struggle and terror. He participated in the Lipetsk Congress of political terrorists in June 1879. Zhelyabov was accepted in “Zemlya i volya” at the Voronezh Congress of its members and came forward as one of the chief defenders of terrorism. After the split of "Zemlya i volya", he was one of the main organizers of "Narodnaya volya" and its newspaper "Worker’s Gazette" (fall of 1880). Zhelyabov took active part in devising a few of the most important documents of the party's Program. Also, he was one of the chief organizers of the assassination of Alexander II of Russia on March 1, 1881. However, he had been arrested a few days before it actually happened. Zhelyabov demanded that his case be considered together with the case of the Pervomartovtsi. He was executed by hanging on April 3, 1881, with the rest of the terrorists, including his wife Sophia Perovskaya.

In admiration of Zhelyabov's dedication to his revolutionary cause, Vladimir Lenin went as far as to compare him with other great revolutionaries, such as Maximilien Robespierre and Giuseppe Garibaldi.

References
Croft, Lee B. Nikolai Ivanovich Kibalchich: Terrorist Rocket Pioneer. IHHS. 2006. . Appreciable content on Zhelyabov.
Footman, David. Red Prelude: The Life of the Russian Terrorist Zhelyabov. Yale University Press. 1945, 1974 revised.
Seth, Ronald. The Russian Terrorists: The Story of the Narodniki. Barrie and Rockcliff. 1966.
Trifonov, Yuri. Translation from the Russian by Robert Daglish. The Impatient Ones. Progress Publishers. 1978.

1851 births
1881 deaths
People from Sovetskyi Raion
Narodniks
Narodnaya Volya
Executed revolutionaries
Executed people from the Russian Empire
19th-century executions by the Russian Empire
Revolutionaries from the Russian Empire
People executed by the Russian Empire by hanging